Streptomyces mesophilus is a bacterium species from the genus of Streptomyces which has been isolated from sediments of the Lake Yeniçağa in the Bolu Province.

See also 
 List of Streptomyces species

References 

mesophilus
Bacteria described in 2021